Arnaud Guillon (born 1964, Caen) is a contemporary French writer, the winner of the Prix Roger Nimier in 2000 for his novel Écume Palace and the Prix Henri de Régnier in 2015 for Tableau de chasse, une passion très coupable.

Works 
 1993: Tous comptes faits, interview with Pierre Moinot, éditions Quai Voltaire, 
 1994: Mauvais Genre, interview with François Nourissier realised by Frédéric Badré and Arnaud Guillon, éditions Quai Voltaire, 
 1998: Daisy printemps 69, Plon, 
 2000: Écume Palace, Éditions Arléa, series "1er Mille",  – Prix Roger Nimier
 2002: 15 août, Arléa, series "1er Mille", 
 2005: Près du corps, Plon, 
 2006: Hit-parade, Plon, 
 2015: Tableau de chasse, Éditions , 2015 ; reprint Le Livre de Poche, 2016,  – Prix Henri de Régnier

References

External links 
 Arnaud Guillon on Éditions Héloïse d'Ormesson
 Tableau de chasse on Le Livre de Poche
 Arnaud Guillon - Tableau de chasse on YouTube 
 Arnaud Guillon on the site of the Académie française

20th-century French non-fiction writers
21st-century French non-fiction writers
Roger Nimier Prize winners
1964 births
Writers from Caen
Living people